Emu Downs may refer to:

 Emu Downs, South Australia
 Emu Downs Wind Farm, Western Australia